Von Gerber is a surname. Notable people with the surname include:

Carl Wilhelm von Gerber (1883–1959), Swedish diplomat
Carl von Gerber (1931–2013), Swedish sprint canoeist
Francesca Marlene de Czanyi von Gerber (born 1931), American actress
Tage von Gerber (1885–1966), Swedish genealogist